Rome and its metropolitan area has a Mediterranean climate (Köppen climate classification: Csa), with mild winters and warm to hot summers. According to Troll-Paffen climate classification, Rome has a warm-temperate subtropical climate (Warmgemäßigt-subtropisches Zonenklima). According to Siegmund/Frankenberg climate classification, Rome has a subtropical climate.

Daylight
Rome is more southerly than most cities in Europe, and the duration of daylight throughout the year is more similar to Chicago or New York City (all three at approximately 40°N) than Berlin (~52°N) or Paris (48°N). Days in winter are not as short as in northern Europe, and the average duration of daylight in December, January and February is 10 hours (for comparison: London or Moscow or Warsaw – about 8 hours).

Sunshine and UV index
Sunshine duration is about 2,500 hours per year, from 111 – average 3.6 hours of sunshine per day in December to 332 – average 10.7 hours of sunshine per day in July. This is the middling value for the southern half of Europe because in this part of the continent, sunshine duration varies from about 2,000 to about 3,000 hours per year. However, this is 60% larger value than in northern half of Europe, where sunshine duration is around 1500 hours per year. In winter Rome has about three times more sun duration than in the northern half of Europe. With the exception of Madrid, Lisbon and Athens, Rome has the highest UV index between European capitals (only in the continent) and values close to that of Chicago at 41.9 °N as ultraviolet radiation is less interfered with by other geographic variables, but with a moderate annual average with index equal to 5, which allows direct exposure to the sun at some times of the year. Values range from 1 (December) to 9 (July).

Sea temperature

Climatic data

Recent data

Old data

See also
 Climate of Ancient Rome

References

Rome
Rome
Geography of Rome
Metropolitan City of Rome Capital